The Honeymoon is a 1917 American silent comedy film directed by Charles Giblyn and starring Constance Talmadge, Earle Foxe, and Maude Turner Gordon.

Cast

References

Bibliography
 Donald W. McCaffrey & Christopher P. Jacobs. Guide to the Silent Years of American Cinema. Greenwood Publishing, 1999.

External links

1917 films
1917 comedy films
Silent American comedy films
Films directed by Charles Giblyn
American silent feature films
1910s English-language films
American black-and-white films
Selznick Pictures films
1910s American films